Coleshill is a market town and civil parish in the North Warwickshire district of Warwickshire, England, taking its name from the River Cole, on which it stands.

Geography
Coleshill is located on a ridge between the rivers Cole and Blythe which converge to the north with the River Tame. It is just to the east of the border with West Midlands county outside Birmingham. According to the 2001 Census statistics it was part of the West Midlands conurbation but was later removed in the 2011 Census along with Water Orton.

History
Coleshill began life in the Iron Age, before the Roman conquest of 43AD at the Grimstock Hill Romano-British settlement, north of the River Cole.  Evidence of hut circles were found by archaeologists at the end of the 1970s.  These excavations showed that throughout the Roman period there was a Romano-Celtic temple on Grimstock Hill. It had developed over the earlier Iron Age huts and had gone through at least three phases of development. The area was at the junction of two powerful Celtic Tribes – the Coritanii to the east from Leicester, and to the west the Cornovii from Viroconium Cornoviorum. In the post Roman or Arthurian period (The Dark Ages), the nucleus of Coleshill moved about a kilometre to the south, to the top of the hill. Here the present church is set and the medieval town developed around it. 

By 1066 the town was a Royal Manor held by King Edward the Confessor and is recorded in the Domesday Book of 1086 as land held by William the Conqueror and the site of the court for the ancient hundred of Coleshill.  In 1284/5 John de Clinton, elder, was granted Coleshill Manor by King Henry II, and claimed by prescription within the lordship of Coleshill, Assize of bread and ale, gallows, pillory, tumbrell and court leet, infangthef and utfangthef, a market, fair, and free warren. He died in 1316. His heir was his 12-year-old grandson, John, who subsequently married a daughter of Sir Roger Hilary, and died in 1353 or 1354 leaving one daughter Joan. She had as her first husband Sir John of Montfort, illegitimate son of Sir Peter de Montfort of Beaudesert. 

Coleshill Manor then passed to this branch of Sir Simon de Montford who moated the manor houses at Coleshill and Kingshurst. King Henry VII granted Coleshill Manor and its lands to Simon Digby in 1496 following the execution and forfeiture of Sir Simon de Montford for supporting the rebellion of Perkin Warbeck. The (Wingfield-Digby) family descendants still hold the titles. Coleshill village was granted a market charter by King John in 1207, alongside Liverpool, Leek and Great Yarmouth. During the era of stagecoach and the turnpike trusts, Coleshill became important as a major staging post on the coaching roads from London to Chester, Liverpool and Holyhead. At one point there were over twenty inns in the town. The Coleshill to Lichfield Turnpike dates from 1743.

Notable buildings

Many former coaching inns remain in Coleshill, mostly along the High Street and Coventry Road. One of the most notable buildings in the town is the parish's Church of St Peter and St Paul at the top of the Market Square. It has a 52-metre (170 ft) high steeple, one of the finest in Warwickshire, dating from the 13th century.  Inside there is a 12th-century font of Norman origin, which is one of the finest examples in the country. There are also medieval table tombs with effigies of Knights, including John de Clinton. Just outside the south door are the preserved remains of a medieval cross. 

Church Street is the location of the town's pillory and whipping post, which were last used in 1863. A bronze sculpture by Peter Walker in the High Street shows three themes of the towns origins: a stagecoach wheel, a visiting circus elephant and the creation of the Typhoo Tea brand by John Sumner.

Transport

The town is close to the M6, M6 Toll and M42 motorways. It is on Junction 4 of the M6, with Birmingham City Centre at Junction 6, Sutton Coldfield J5, Nuneaton, Bedworth and Coventry North at J3 and Coventry East at Junction 2. The town is connected to East Birmingham by the B4114 Road which subsequently creates a road connection into the City Centre. There is also a route to Coventry via the A446, which becomes the A452 just before the A45 road junction at Stonebridge. The A4114 road now takes you to the city centre ring road A4053 after the A45 was diverted to run south of Coventry acting as a bypass. A number of bus routes serve the town, including one to Birmingham, the Number X70 Route which terminates in Chelmsley Wood operated by National Express West Midlands. The new railway station also has an interchange serving a direct Sutton Coldfield – Coleshill - Birmingham Airport bus connection.

The town is served by Coleshill Parkway railway station, which reopened in 2007, on the site of the previous Coleshill station, which had closed in 1968. It is on the Birmingham to Peterborough Line and is served half hourly by CrossCountry as part of their service between Birmingham, Nuneaton, Leicester, Peterborough, Cambridge and Stansted Airport. Historically the town was also served by Maxstoke on the Stonebridge Railway which closed in 1917 and Coleshill railway station, originally named Forge Mills, which closed in 1968.

Twin Town
Coleshill has been twinned with Chassieu near Lyon in France since 1983.

Education
The Coleshill School
Coleshill Church of England Primary School
St Edwards Roman Catholic Primary School
High Meadow Community School Primary School
Woodland Special School

Notable people from Coleshill
 Reverend George Lloyd (1820–1885), a curate and archaeologist
 Baron Plumb, farmer and politician
 John Wynne (1819–1893), cricketer

References

External links
Coleshill Community
Coleshill at British History Online

 
Market towns in Warwickshire
Towns in Warwickshire
Burial sites of the FitzGerald dynasty